In enzymology, a NADPH:quinone reductase is an enzyme that catalyzes the chemical reaction

NADPH + H+ + 2quinone  NADP+ + 2semiquinone

The 3 substrates of this enzyme are NADPH, H+, and quinone, whereas its two products are NADP+ and semiquinone.

This enzyme belongs to the family of oxidoreductases, specifically those acting on NADH or NADPH with a quinone or similar compound as acceptor.  The systematic name of this enzyme class is NADPH:quinone oxidoreductase. This enzyme is also called NADPH2:quinone reductase.

Structural studies

References

 

EC 1.6.5
NADPH-dependent enzymes
Enzymes of known structure